Saturday Night Special  is an album by the Philadelphia, Pennsylvania jazz drummer Norman Connors.

Track listing
"Saturday Night Special"  (Reggie Lucas)  5:10
"Dindi"  (Antônio Carlos Jobim, Vinicius de Moraes)  6:00 Lead Vocals – Jean Carn
"Maiden Voyage"  (Herbie Hancock)  6:30
"Valentine Love"  (Michael Henderson)  3:45  Lead Vocals – Michael Henderson & Jean Carn
"Akia"  (Kevin Nance, Onaje Allan Gumbs)  3:45
"Skin Diver"  (Dwight Carson, Harry Whitaker)  6:55 Lead Vocals – Jean Carn
"Kwasi"  (Norman Connors, Onaje Allan Gumbs)  4:30

Personnel
Norman Connors - drums
Michael Henderson - bass, vocals
Reggie Lucas - electric guitar
Herbie Hancock - piano
Buster Williams - double bass
Robert King - acoustic guitar
Bernie Krause - Moog synthesizer
Hubert Eaves III - electric piano, organ, piano, Clavinet
Onaje Allan Gumbs - piano, electric piano, organ, synthesizer
Eddie Henderson - trumpet, flugelhorn
David Subke, William O. Murphy, Jr. - flute
Gary Bartz - alto saxophone, soprano saxophone
Carlos Garnett - tenor saxophone
Myra Bucky, Nathan Rubin - violin 
Nancy Ellis - viola
Terry Adams - cello
Bill Summers - additional percussion
Ken Nash - congas, cuica (quica), percussion (Indonesian temple shakers, African, Asian and Latin American hand percussion)
Jean Carn - vocals

Charts

Singles

References

External links
 Norman Connors-Saturday Night Special at Discogs

1975 albums
Norman Connors albums
Buddah Records albums
Albums recorded at Wally Heider Studios